Obtusipalpis brunneata is a moth in the family Crambidae. It was described by George Hampson in 1919. It is found in Ethiopia, Madagascar and Nigeria.

The larvae feed on Ficus melleri.

References

Moths described in 1919
Spilomelinae